Far from the Madding Crowd is a 1967 British epic period drama film adapted from Thomas Hardy's 1874 book of the same name. The film, starring Julie Christie, Alan Bates, Terence Stamp and Peter Finch, and directed by John Schlesinger, was Schlesinger's fourth film (and his third collaboration with Christie). It marked a stylistic shift away from his earlier works exploring contemporary urban mores. The cinematography was by Nicolas Roeg and the soundtrack was by Richard Rodney Bennett. He also used traditional folk songs in various scenes throughout the film.

It was nominated for one Oscar for Best Original Music Score and two BAFTAs, Best British Cinematography (Colour) and Best British Costume (Colour) (Alan Barrett).

Plot
Set in the rural West Country in Victorian England (circa 1870), the story features Bathsheba Everdene (Julie Christie), a beautiful, headstrong, independently minded woman who inherits her uncle's farm and decides to manage it herself. This engenders some disapproval from the local farming community. She employs a former neighbour, Gabriel Oak (Alan Bates), as a shepherd; rejected by her earlier as a suitor, Gabriel lost his own flock after one of his dogs drove them off a cliff.

Bathsheba impulsively sends a valentine to William Boldwood (Peter Finch), a nearby gentleman farmer. Misinterpreting her capriciousness, he falls passionately in love with her and proposes; Bathsheba promises to consider his offer. However, she soon meets and becomes enamoured of Frank Troy (Terence Stamp), a dashing cavalry sergeant.

Troy was to marry young Fanny Robin (Prunella Ransome), a maidservant pregnant with his child, but she went to the wrong church on their wedding day; Troy, unreasonably insulted and humiliated, refuses to go through with the ceremony. He was then posted to a different town. Bathsheba marries Troy but soon regrets her impulsive decision. Troy gambles away much of Bathsheba's money and creates disharmony among the farmhands. He is filled with remorse upon learning that Fanny has died in childbirth and swears he never loved Bathsheba. He leaves her and his clothes are later found by the ocean where he has presumably drowned.

Boldwood coerces Bathsheba to marry him once Troy is declared legally dead. However, the sergeant reappears at their engagement party to reclaim his wife; Boldwood shoots and kills him.

Boldwood is last seen in a prison cell, awaiting execution. Gabriel tells Bathsheba that he is immigrating to The United States. Realising how much she needs his quiet strength and unselfish devotion, Bathsheba persuades Gabriel to remain in Weatherbury, and they marry.

Cast

Production
The film keeps close to the book.

The budget was $3 million, 80% of which was provided by MGM, 20% by Anglo-Amalgamated.

The film was shot largely on location in Dorset and Wiltshire.

Release
The film premiered on 16 October 1967 at the Odeon Marble Arch attended by Princess Margaret and Lord Snowdon.

Reception
The film is memorable for the subtly erotic scene between Sgt Troy and Bathsheba in which he flaunts his expert skills as a swordsman in a private fencing display in a prehistoric earthwork (actually Maiden Castle).

Roger Ebert found the scenes of the rural area and rural life to be "splendid". His strongest criticism is that the film missed the point of the small society of rural life:
Thomas Hardy's novel told of a 19th century rural England in which class distinctions and unyielding social codes surrounded his characters. They were far from the madding crowd whether they liked it or not, and got tangled in each other's problems because there was nowhere else to turn. It's not simply that Bathsheba (Julie Christie) was courted by the three men in her life, but that she was courted by ALL three men in her life.

The film performed well at the box office in the UK but was a commercial failure in the U.S.

Far from the Madding Crowd received mixed to positive reviews from critics; the film holds a 64% rating on Rotten Tomatoes, based on 28 reviews.

Awards
 Won
 National Board of Review Award for Best Film
 National Board of Review Award for Best Actor (Peter Finch)

 Nominated
 Academy Award for Best Original Score
 Golden Globe Award for Best Motion Picture – Drama
 Golden Globe Award for Best Actor – Motion Picture Drama (Alan Bates)
 Golden Globe Award for Best Supporting Actress (Prunella Ransome)
 BAFTA Award for Best Cinematography
 BAFTA Award for Best Costume Design

References in popular culture

Books 
 Going Loco by Lynne Truss, 1999,

See also
 BFI Top 100 British films

References

Further reading
 Tibbetts, John C., and James M. Welsh, eds. The Encyclopedia of Novels Into Film (2nd ed. 2005) pp 136–127.

External links
 
 
 
 
 
 See screenshots and read more about the film at The Alan Bates Archive.

1967 films
1960s historical romance films
1967 romantic drama films
British romantic drama films
Films about farmers
Films based on works by Thomas Hardy
British historical romance films
Romantic period films
Films set in England
Films set on farms
Films set in the 1870s
Films directed by John Schlesinger
Films scored by Richard Rodney Bennett
Films shot in Dorset
Films shot in Wiltshire
Metro-Goldwyn-Mayer films
1960s English-language films
1960s British films